Acacia axillaris, commonly known as midlands mimosa or midlands wattle, is a shrub belonging to the genus Acacia and the subgenus Juliflorae that is native to Tasmania. The species was list as vulnerable in 2014.

Description
Like most species of Acacia it has phyllodes rather than true leaves. The phyllodes are usually thick and rigid and have often have three veins on each face with one more prominent than the others. It produces yellow flowers between September and October and fruits in February. The seed pods that form after flowering are subcylindrical or resemble a string of bead.

Distribution
The shrub is mostly situated in the agricultural area in lowland pastures of the Midlands, in north eastern Central Tasmania and also on Mount Barrow in the subalpine zone of north eastern Tasmania. It is distributed through five localities; Mount Barrow and within the Elizabeth, St Paul, Dukes and Lake River catchment areas. A total population of approximately 45,000 individuals is known across 18 populations.

See also
List of Acacia species

References

axillaris
Flora of Tasmania
Taxa named by George Bentham
Plants described in 1842
Central Highlands (Tasmania)